Prodigy Finance is a fintech platform that enables financing for international postgraduate students who attend a participating business school or postgraduate institution.

Prodigy Finance's loans are collectively funded by a community of alumni, institutional investors and qualified private investors who receive a financial and social return; while the borrower gains access to higher education that they might not otherwise be able to finance.

Since 2007, Prodigy Finance has disbursed over US$1.4 billion through the platform to fund over 20,000 students from 150 nationalities. Prodigy Finance is registered in London with offices in London, Cape Town and New York.

Overview 
Three INSEAD MBA graduates conceptualised Prodigy Finance during their studies in 2006, as their experience highlighted an opportunity to bridge the financing gap often experienced by high-potential international postgraduate students looking to attend a top school. Prodigy Finance was founded in 2007 with the intention of addressing this challenge, as Prodigy Finance Founder Cameron Stevens experienced himself. The Prodigy Finance concept was recognised at the 2006 International Venture Capital Investment Competition at INSEAD, resulting in the initial seed money for the company.

History 

Prodigy Finance started with a peer-to-peer funding programme for INSEAD students. Alumni invested in bonds which enabled students to study their MBA at that institution. Leveraging this peer-to-peer lending, Prodigy Finance began offering loans to MBA candidates enrolled at other leading business schools.

In 2014, Prodigy Finance announced the launch of a US$25 million Education Note in partnership with the Credit Suisse Impact Investing and Microfinance team. The Education Note has a focus on students from emerging markets, enabling them to study at top postgraduate programmes.

In 2015, Prodigy Finance announced a $12.5 million equity investment from Balderton Capital and various angel investors, and $110 million in loan capital from Credit Suisse, Deutsche Bank and other private investors.

In 2017, Prodigy Finance announced a $240 million fundraise. This included a $40 million Series C equity round led by international venture capital firm Index Ventures, with participation from Balderton Capital and AlphaCode; and a $200 million debt facility led by a global investment bank.

Loans for international students 

Prodigy Finance supports postgraduate programmes in the fields of business, engineering, public policy, law and health sciences.

This includes the Financial Times Top 100 ranked business schools, such as INSEAD, Wharton, Chicago Booth, IESE, Columbia Business School, London Business School, Imperial College Business School, Emlyon Business School, NUS, University of Oxford's Saïd Business School, Stanford, and Yale School of Management.

To be eligible for a loan, students must be studying outside of their home country, or country of residence. One exception is in the United Kingdom, as Prodigy Finance can lend to domestic students. Applicants must already be accepted at a participating institution to qualify.

See also 

 Master of Business Administration
 Master of Finance
 Student loans in the United Kingdom
 SoFi
 Lending Club

References

External links 
 Prodigy Finance Website
 Prodigy Finance Blog

Business schools
Crowdsourcing
Loans
2007 establishments in England